Constantin Carabela (born 21 July 1940) is a Romanian biathlete. He competed at the 1964 Winter Olympics, the 1968 Winter Olympics and the 1972 Winter Olympics.

References

External links
 

1940 births
Living people
Romanian male biathletes
Olympic biathletes of Romania
Biathletes at the 1964 Winter Olympics
Biathletes at the 1968 Winter Olympics
Biathletes at the 1972 Winter Olympics
People from Sinaia